The Coto Brus River is a river of Costa Rica.

See also
Coto Brus (canton)

References

Rivers of Costa Rica